Sarah Hosking (born 2 December 1995) is an Australian rules footballer with the Richmond Football Club in the AFL Women's (AFLW). She previously played for the Carlton Football Club from 2017 to 2020. Hosking represented Victoria in the inaugural AFL Women's State of Origin match in 2017, and is the identical twin sister of Richmond team-mate Jess Hosking.

Early life
Hosking was born a minute earlier than her twin sister Jess.

AFL Women's career

Carlton (2017–2020)
She made her debut in the inaugural AFL Women's match against  at Ikon Park while her sister Jess missed the inaugural season with a left anterior cruciate ligament injury, making her debut in the corresponding match the following year. On 2 September 2017, Hosking played for Victoria in the inaugural AFL Women's State of Origin match.

In 2018, Hosking recorded a then-league record 16 tackles in Carlton's round 2 win against  in heavy rain. Her record was broken two weeks later when 's Ebony Marinoff recorded 21 tackles, a national senior-level record, in similar conditions against the same opponent in round 4.

Richmond (2021–present)

Statistics
Statistics are correct to the end of the 2021 season.

|- style=background:#EAEAEA
| scope=row | 2017 ||  || 10
| 7 || 2 || 0 || 35 || 28 || 63 || 11 || 17 || 0.3 || 0.0 || 5.0 || 4.0 || 9.0 || 1.6 || 2.4 || 0
|-
| scope=row | 2018 ||  || 10
| 7 || 0 || 1 || 45 || 39 || 84 || 12 || 40 || 0.0 || 0.1 || 6.4 || 5.6 || 12.0 || 1.7 || 5.7 || 1
|- style=background:#EAEAEA
| scope=row | 2019 ||  || 10
| 9 || 1 || 2 || 55 || 32 || 87 || 19 || 27 || 0.1 || 0.2 || 6.1 || 3.6 || 9.7 || 2.1 || 3.0 || 3
|-
| scope=row | 2020 ||  || 10
| 7 || 2 || 1 || 51 || 31 || 82 || 18 || 22 || 0.3 || 0.1 || 7.3 || 4.4 || 11.7 || 2.6 || 3.1 || 0
|-
| scope=row | 2021 ||  || 7
| 9 || 1 || 3 || 73 || 56 || 129 || 31 || 38 || 0.1 || 0.3 || 8.1 || 6.2 || 14.3 || 3.4 || 4.2 || 0
|- class=sortbottom
! colspan=3 | Career
! 39 !! 6 !! 7 !! 259 !! 186 !! 445 !! 91 !! 142 !! 0.2 !! 0.2 !! 6.5 !! 4.8 !! 11.3 !! 2.3 !! 3.6 !! 4
|}

Honours and achievements
Individual
 Victoria representative honours in AFL Women's State of Origin: 2017

References

External links

 
 

Living people
1995 births
Identical twins
Carlton Football Club (AFLW) players
Australian rules footballers from Victoria (Australia)
Sportswomen from Victoria (Australia)
Richmond Football Club (AFLW) players